Senna marilandica, commonly known as Maryland senna, Maryland wild senna, and wild senna, is a perennial flowering plant in the pea family (Fabaceae) native to the United States. It prefers average to wet soil.

Description
The compound leaves are alternate and pinnate with four to eight pairs of opposite leaflets on each leaf.

The inflorescences are racemes of six to nine yellow flowers, appearing both from the leaf axils (axillary) and at the end of the stems (terminal). The stamens have prominent brownish anthers. The flowers do not have nectaries.

Distribution and habitat
S. marilandica is native in the United States from Nebraska to the west, Florida and Texas to the south, Wisconsin to the north, and New York to the east. It is a species of special concern in Wisconsin. The plant is found in woodland edges, open fields, and thickets, and in moist areas such as riverbanks and moist prairies.

Ecology
The flowers bloom from early July through late August, and the seed pods form from early August through late September. Bumblebees, butterflies, and solitary bees visit the flowers. Although the flowers do not have nectaries, extrafloral nectaries are located at the base of the leaves that are higher on the stem, in the inflorescence, and ants, parasitic wasps, and lady beetles feed on the nectar.

S. marilandica is a larval host to the cloudless sulphur (Phoebis sennae), orange-barred sulphur (Phoebis philea), sleepy orange (Eurema nicippe), and little sulphur (Eurema lisa) butterflies.

References

marilandica
Plants described in 1753
Taxa named by Carl Linnaeus
Flora of the Northeastern United States
Flora of the Southeastern United States
Flora of the South-Central United States
Flora of the North-Central United States